The 2016 Porsche Tennis Grand Prix was a women's tennis tournament played on indoor clay courts. It was the 39th edition of the Porsche Tennis Grand Prix, and part of the Premier tournaments of the 2016 WTA Tour. It took place at the Porsche Arena in Stuttgart, Germany, from 18 April through 24 April 2016.

Besides the prize money the singles champion won a Porsche 718 Boxster S sports car.

Points and prize money

Point distribution

Prize money 

* per team

Singles main draw entrants

Seeds 

 1 Rankings are as of April 11, 2016.

Other entrants 
The following players received wildcards into the main draw:
  Anna-Lena Friedsam
  Julia Görges

The following players received entry from the qualifying draw:
  Louisa Chirico 
  Océane Dodin 
  Laura Siegemund 
  Carina Witthöft

The following player received entry as a lucky loser:
  Camila Giorgi

Withdrawals 
Before the tournament
  Belinda Bencic (back injury) → replaced by  Caroline Garcia
  Sara Errani (right leg injury) → replaced by  Camila Giorgi
  Madison Keys → replaced by  Monica Niculescu
  Svetlana Kuznetsova → replaced by  Alizé Cornet
  Maria Sharapova (provisional suspension) → replaced by  Ekaterina Makarova

Doubles main draw entrants

Seeds 

 Rankings are as of April 11, 2016.

Other entrants 
The following pairs received wildcards into the main draw:
  Annika Beck /  Roberta Vinci
  Anna-Lena Friedsam /  Andrea Petkovic
  Sabine Lisicki /  Lucie Šafářová

Withdrawals 
During the tournament
  Andrea Petkovic (lower back injury)

Finals

Singles 

  Angelique Kerber defeated  Laura Siegemund, 6–4, 6–0.

Doubles 

  Caroline Garcia /  Kristina Mladenovic defeated  Martina Hingis /  Sania Mirza, 2–6, 6–1, [10–6].

References

External links 
 
 Women's Tennis Association (WTA) tournament profile
 Women's Tennis Association (WTA) tournament event details

Porsche Tennis Grand Prix
Porsche Tennis Grand Prix
Porsche Tennis Grand Prix
2010s in Baden-Württemberg
Porsch